T13 or T-13 may refer to:

Aviation 
 Dallas South Port Airport, in Ellis County, Texas, United States
 Slingsby T.13 Petrel, a British glider
 Vultee BT-13A Valiant, an American military trainer

Rail and transit

Lines 
 Île-de-France tramway Line 13 Express
 T13 line, of the Stockholm Metro

Locomotives 
 Prussian T 13, a steam locomotive

Stations 
 Karasuma Oike Station, Kyoto, Japan
 Kawana Station (Nagoya), Aichi Prefecture, Japan
 Kiba Station, Tokyo, Japan
 Nibu Station, Higashikagawa, Kagawa Prefecture, Japan
 Shiroishi Station (Sapporo Municipal Subway), Hokkaido, Japan
 Taishibashi-Imaichi Station, Osaka, Japan

Weapons and armor 
 BEANO T-13 grenade, an American hand grenade
 T-13 tank destroyer, a British-engineered Belgian tank destroyer

Other uses
 T13 (classification), a disability sport classification
 Estonian national road 13
 
 Patau syndrome, also known as trisomy 13
 Port Sorell language
 Soyuz T-13, a crewed spaceflight
 Teletrece, a Chilean news programme